La casa al final de la calle (English title: The house at the end of the street) is a Mexican telenovela produced by Juan Osorio for Televisa in 1989.

Angélica Aragón, Leticia Calderón, Héctor Bonilla and Eduardo Palomo starred as protagonists, Margarita Gralia and Guillermo García Cantú starred as co-protagonists, while José Alonso starred as antagonist. Luis Bayardo and Saby Kamalich starred.

Cast 

 Héctor Bonilla as César Peralta
 Angélica Aragón as Leonor Altamirano Nájera
 Leticia Calderón as Teresa Altamirano Nájera
 Luis Bayardo as Roberto Gaytán
 Saby Kamalich as Esperanza de Gaytán
 José Alonso as Bronski
 Margarita Gralia as Rebeca Ulloa
 Guillermo García Cantú as Braulio
 Eduardo Palomo as Claudio Juárez
 Lilia Aragón as Iris Carrillo
 Octavio Galindo as Gustavo
 Dunia Zaldívar as Guadalupe
 Gina Moret as Gloria
 Alejandra Peniche as Laura
 Narciso Busquets as Don Renato
 Erneto Vilchis as Virgilio
 Alejandra Vidal as Elsa
 Paco Rabell as Iglesias
 Maricarmen Vela as Ligia Andrade
 Teresa Rábago as Luisa
 Cecilia Romo as Verónica
 Jaime Ortiz Pino as Dr. Balbuena
 Nando Estevane as Marcelo
 Beatriz Martínez as Dra. Ponce
 Miguel Macía as Márquez
 Luis de Icaza as Alex
 Marta Verduzco as Eva Estrada
 Blas García as Rubén
 Tere Mondragón as Engracia
 José Luis Padilla as Patricio
 Josefina Echánove as María
 Tina Romero as Marina Durán
 Claudio Obregón as Sergio Escobar
 Luis Couturier as Víctor Gálvez
 Alonso Echánove as Rafael Lozada
 Elizabeth Katz as Eva Estrada (young)
 Guillermo Gil as Óscar

Awards

References

External links 

1989 telenovelas
Mexican horror fiction television series
Mexican telenovelas
Televisa telenovelas
1989 Mexican television series debuts
1989 Mexican television series endings
Television shows set in Mexico City
Television shows set in London
Television shows set in Paris
Spanish-language telenovelas